The Philippines has just qualified for one AFC Asian Cup, making their maiden debut at the 2019 AFC Asian Cup.

Prior to the 2010s, includes most of 20th century, the Philippines generally struggled to even manage victories and they didn't have much opportunity to play in the Asian Cup qualifications due to lack of funding, popularity of basketball and turmoils within the nation. Philippines was considered as a much weaker team until a 2010 AFF Championship surprise started the football renaissance in the islands. The Philippines, however, failed to qualify for 2011 and 2015 editions before they managed to qualify for the first time in 2019.

During the 2019 AFC Asian Cup qualification second round, which also served as World Cup qualification, the Philippines failed to progress into the next round of the World Cup qualification after losing to Uzbekistan and worse records than North Korea, but in the third round, they successfully topped the group with three wins and three draws, to book their ticket to the UAE. The rising level of football success in the Philippines has given hopes for Filipinos when the Azkals will made their debut in 2019.

Record

2019 in the United Arab Emirates

Group C

See also
Philippines at the AFC Women's Asian Cup

References 

Countries at the AFC Asian Cup
AFC Asian Cup